The F. B. Colony Ground, previously known as the Alembic No 2 Ground, is a cricket ground in Vadodara, India. It was inaugurated in September 2009, with the first matches taking place in the 2010/11 cricket season. It was selected as one of the venues for the 2020–21 Syed Mushtaq Ali Trophy and the 2021–22 Syed Mushtaq Ali Trophy tournaments.

See also
 List of cricket grounds in India

References

Cricket grounds in Gujarat